Pyry Niemi (born 1965) is a Swedish politician.  he serves as Member of the Riksdag representing the constituency of Uppsala County. He is of Finnish descent and is fluent in Finnish language. 

He serves as the President of the Baltic Sea Parliamentary Conference 2020-2021.

He previously worked as a sales manager.

References 

Living people
1965 births
Place of birth missing (living people)
21st-century Swedish politicians
Members of the Riksdag 2010–2014
Members of the Riksdag 2014–2018
Members of the Riksdag 2018–2022
Members of the Riksdag from the Social Democrats